The 2006 Mondial Australian Women's Hardcourts was a women's tennis tournament played on outdoor hard courts. It was the 10th edition of the event then known as the Mondial Australian Women's Hardcourts, and was a Tier III event on the 2006 WTA Tour. It took place in Gold Coast, Queensland, Australia, from 1 January through 7 January 2006. Unseeded Lucie Šafářová won the singles title and earned $28,000 first-prize money.

WTA entrants

Seeds

Rankings as of 19 December 2005.

Other entrants
The following players received wildcards into the singles main draw:
  Sophie Ferguson
  Nicole Pratt
  Martina Hingis

The following players received entry from the qualifying draw:
  Angela Haynes
  Jarmila Gajdošová
  Sun Tiantian
  Yuan Meng

Finals

Singles

 Lucie Šafářová defeated  Flavia Pennetta, 6–3, 6–4

Doubles

 Dinara Safina /  Meghann Shaughnessy defeated  Cara Black /  Rennae Stubbs, 6–2, 6–3

External links
 ITF tournament edition details
 Tournament draws

 
Mondial Australian Women's Hardcourts
2006
Mondial Australian Women's Hardcourts
Mondial Australian Women's Hardcourts